"Craziest" is the second single released from Naughty by Nature's fourth album, Poverty's Paradise. The song was a mild success on the Billboard Hot 100 and Hot R&B/Hip-Hop Singles & Tracks, peaking at 51 and 27 on the charts respectively, but it became Naughty by Nature's fourth top 10 single on the Hot Rap Singles, peaking at 5 on that chart. The video was directed by Hype Williams.

Single track listing

A-Side
"Craziest" (Original)- 4:10  
"Craziest" (Syrup And Water Vocal Mix) remix by Crazy C- 4:17  
"Craziest" (Instrumental)- 3:49

B-Side
"Holdin' Fort" (Original Mix)- 3:35  
"Holdin' Fort" (LG & LoRider Remix)- 4:13  
"Craziest" (A Capella)- 3:03

Charts

Weekly charts

Year-end charts

References

1994 songs
1995 singles
Naughty by Nature songs
Tommy Boy Records singles
Songs written by Treach
Music videos directed by Hype Williams
Hardcore hip hop songs
Songs written by Ronald Isley
Songs written by Ernie Isley
Songs written by Chris Jasper
Songs written by Rudolph Isley
Songs written by O'Kelly Isley Jr.
Songs written by Marvin Isley
Song recordings produced by Naughty by Nature
Songs written by KayGee
Songs written by Vin Rock